During the period known as The Troubles in Northern Ireland (1969–1998), the British Army and Royal Ulster Constabulary (RUC) were accused by Republicans of operating a "shoot-to-kill" policy, under which suspected paramilitaries were alleged to have been deliberately killed without any attempt to arrest them. Such a policy was alleged to have been directed almost exclusively at suspected or actual members of Irish republican paramilitary groups. The Special Air Service (SAS) is the most high-profile of the agencies that were accused of employing this policy, as well as other British Army regiments, and the RUC.

Notable incidents alleging the use of the shoot-to-kill policy include the Loughgall ambush; Operation Flavius in Gibraltar; the Drumnakilly ambush; the Coagh ambush; the Clonoe ambush; and an incident in Strabane in which three IRA volunteers were shot dead. The SAS killed 24 Provisional Irish Republican Army (IRA) and Irish National Liberation Army (INLA) members at these locations.

Other high-profile incidents involving alleged shoot-to-kill incidents occurred in Belfast, Londonderry, East and West Tyrone and South Armagh. The killing of Ulster Volunteer Force (UVF) member Brian Robinson by undercover soldiers is notable for being the most prominent of the very few alleged "shoot-to-kill" incidents where the victim was a loyalist.

Petty criminals were also shot. On 13 January 1990 an undercover unit shot dead three men who they believed were members of an IRA unit robbing a shop, but it was later discovered that they were ordinary criminals. Later that year soldiers from the Parachute Regiment shot three joyriders who passed through their checkpoint travelling at high speed, killing two teenagers; one of the soldiers, Lee Clegg, was tried over the shootings.

Stalker/Sampson Inquiry 

On 24 May 1984 an inquiry under Deputy Chief Constable John Stalker of the Greater Manchester Police was opened into three specific cases where it was alleged that a specially trained undercover RUC team known as the "Headquarters Mobile Support Unit" had carried out a "shoot-to-kill" policy:
11 November 1982: The killing of three unarmed IRA members at an RUC checkpoint in east Lurgan, County Armagh. Three officers were acquitted of their murder in June 1984, the presiding judge, Lord Justice Maurice Gibson, commending them for their "courage and determination in bringing the three deceased men to justice – in this case, to the final court of justice."
24 November 1982: The killing, by an RUC undercover unit, of Michael Tighe and the wounding of his friend Martin McCauley at an IRA arms cache on a farm near Lurgan, County Armagh. (19 years later, McCauley was arrested in Colombia, accused by the Colombian authorities of teaching FARC guerillas in the use of explosives, in particular the "barrack buster").
12 December 1982: The killing at an RUC checkpoint in Mullacreavie, County Armagh, of two INLA members, Seamus Grew and Roddy Carroll. (The intended main target, Dominic McGlinchey, was not in their car as expected.)

The shootings were initially investigated by other members of the RUC, and the Director of Public Prosecutions for Northern Ireland decided to bring prosecutions. At the first trial, relating to the shootings of the two INLA men, Constable John Robinson admitted to having been instructed to lie in his statements, and that other witnesses had similarly altered their stories to provide justification for opening fire on Grew and Carroll. When Robinson was found not guilty, the resulting public outcry caused RUC Chief Constable John Hermon to ask John Stalker to investigate the killings.

On 5 June 1986, just before Stalker was to make his final report, he was removed from his position in charge of the inquiry. On 30 June, he was suspended from duty over allegations of association with criminals. On 22 August, he was cleared of the allegations and returned to duty, although he was not reinstated as head of the inquiry. The inquiry was taken over by Colin Sampson of the West Yorkshire Police. Its findings were never made public.

In the book Stalker, published by Stalker in 1988, the following descriptions of his investigation into the three shooting incidents appeared, concerning the McKerr, Toman and Burns shooting:

Concerning the three incidents as a whole, Stalker wrote:

According to The Times of 9 February 1988, Stalker stated that although he never found written evidence of a shoot-to-kill policy, there was a "clear understanding" that officers were expected to enforce it.

In 1990 the RUC issued a response to Stalker's book, saying that the book contained many inaccuracies and distortions and gave a misleading impression. In particular it stated, in contradiction to Stalker's assertions, that:
 it was wrong to allege that the three investigations were carried out under different detectives as the same detective superintendent was in charge of two of the investigations
 the investigation files were presented to the Director of Public Prosecutions in the format approved by him
 it was already established in a police statement of 13 November 1982 that no police officer had been struck by the car driven by Gervaise McKerr
 it had been advisable, for the safety of the three officers, that they leave the scene immediately
 their weapons had been seized without delay by the scene of crimes officers
 no incorrect information was given to the investigating officers concerning where the shooting occurred, although uniformed officers had mistakenly positioned the tape on the junction and it was repositioned accurately shortly afterwards
 although it was accepted that all the cartridges were not recovered, due to the torrential rain at the time some could have been washed down the drains; the area had nonetheless been swept over for two days with metal detectors.

Criticisms were also made that Stalker had gone outside his remit to reinvestigate the shooting incidents as well as a terrorist incident on 27 October 1982 in which three police officers had been killed and that his report, when submitted, lacked the clarity and precision normally associated with criminal investigations.

The government also submitted that, on 23 June 1992, Thorburn, when he withdrew a libel action against the RUC Chief Constable, made a statement in which he took the opportunity to submit publicly that he was satisfied that the RUC had not pursued a shoot-to-kill policy in 1982 and that the RUC Chief Constable had not condoned or authorised any deliberate or reckless killings by his officers. Other members of the Stalker/Sampson inquiry team also stated in June 1990 that "the Greater Manchester officers wish to stress that the Stalker/Sampson Enquiry found no evidence of a 'Shoot to Kill policy'".

Court rulings 

Some of the victims' families were awarded reimbursement of legal expenses from the Ministry of Defence following cases brought to the European Court of Human Rights against the British government. The European judges considered four cases between 1982 and 1992 in which 14 people were killed. They involved the deaths of 12 IRA members and two civilians (one a Sinn Féin member) by the SAS, the RUC and the loyalist Ulster Defence Association, allegedly acting in collusion with the RUC.

In the judgement, the court ruled that eight armed IRA men shot dead by soldiers of an SAS unit at Loughgall, County Armagh, in 1987, and two IRA men killed by RUC officers, had their human rights violated. It said this had arisen because of the failure of the state authorities to conduct a proper investigation into the circumstances of the deaths, though the court did not rule that the use of lethal force itself was unlawful. A similar finding was brought in the case of Sinn Féin member Patrick Shanaghan, who was killed by loyalist paramilitaries. The findings were brought under Article 2 of the European Convention on Human Rights.

Cultural impact 

A number of television programmes were produced about or in reaction to specific incidents in particular or the shoot-to-kill issue in general:

 Death on the Rock – an edition of This Week about the Gibraltar killings, produced by Thames Television for ITV, shown on 28 April 1988.
 Nineteen 96 – a BBC1 Screen One drama, broadcast on BBC1 on 17 September 1989 which, in relocating the Stalker inquiry to Wales in 1996 and combining it with some elements of the Kincora boys' home scandal, treated it as fiction set in the future. Keith Barron was cast as the investigating officer. The drama was written by G. F. Newman and directed by Karl Francis
 Shoot to Kill – a four-hour drama documentary about the Stalker inquiry, with Jack Shepherd in the lead role, David Calder as John Thorburn, and T. P. McKenna as Sir John Hermon. It had originally been intended to be a straightforward documentary, but in the words of the director, "all of the people we would have wanted to interview were either dead – in that they were shot by the RUC in 1982 – they had disappeared and were given new identities, or they were still serving policemen and weren't available for interview." The drama featured re-enactments of all three incidents investigated by Stalker – including information that Dominic McGlinchey had been the intended target in the third – and the course of Stalker's investigation. Written by Michael Eaton and directed by Peter Kosminsky, and produced by Yorkshire Television for ITV, it was shown in two parts on 3 and 4 June 1990, with the second episode being followed by a half-hour studio discussion between Kosminsky, Conservative Member of Parliament Ian Gow (assassinated by the Provisional IRA two months later), Social Democratic and Labour Party MP Seamus Mallon, Ulster Unionist Party MP David Trimble, and Larry Cox of Amnesty International.
 Hidden Agenda – a 1990 film directed by Ken Loach which based a fictionalised version of the Stalker inquiry in the context of the shooting of an American civil rights lawyer.
 Lethal Force – an edition of Panorama investigating a number of cases, including the killing by undercover members of 14 Intelligence Company of John McNeill, Eddie Hale and Peter Thompson, as they attempted to rob a Belfast betting shop armed with replica firearms on 13 January 1990, and the killing by soldiers of 3 Para of joyriders Martin Peake and Karen Reilly on 30 September the same year. It was shown on BBC1 on 22 July 1991.
 You, Me and Marley – a BBC2 Screenplay drama, written by Graham Reid and directed by Richard Spence, inspired by the killing of Peake and Reilly, and shown on 30 September 1992 (the first anniversary of their deaths).

References

Further reading

General 
 Mark Urban (1992), Big Boys Rules:  The SAS and the secret struggle against the IRA. London: Faber and Faber. .
 Graham Ellison, Jim Smyth (2000), The Crowned Harp: Policing Northern Ireland. London: Pluto Press. . pp. 116–133.
 Peter Taylor (2002), Brits: The War Against the IRA. London: Bloomsbury. .
 Sean McPhilemy (1999), The Committee: Political Assassination in Northern Ireland. Roberts Rinehart. . Scribd

Stalker Affair 
 Frank Doherty (1986), The Stalker Affair. Dublin: Mercer Press.
 Peter Taylor (1987), Stalker: The Search for Truth. London: Faber and Faber.
 The Committee on the Administration of Justice (1988), The Stalker Affair: More Questions than Answers. Belfast: CAJ.
 John Stalker (1988), Stalker. London: Harrap.
 Kevin Taylor with Kevin Mumby (1990), The Poisoned Tree. London: Sidgwick and Jackson.
 David Murphy (1991), The Stalker Affair and the Press. London: Unwin Hyman.

Articles 
 David Leigh, Jonathan Foster and Paul Lashmar, Ulster death squad secrets exposed / Sudden death in the dark, The Observer, 12 October 1986; p. 1 & p. 3

External links 
 Peter Taylor, Secrets and Lies, The Guardian, 23 May 2000
 Information regarding the murder of Pat Finucane
 Claims of state sponsored murder in Ireland
 Article on police shootings in the UK
 "The Stalker Affair" by Paul Lashmar (Violations of Rights in Britain Series 3 No.27)
 Shoot to Kill, The Stalker and Stevens Inquiries
 "Murder on the Rock" by Maxine Williams. Article includes a list of suspected shoot-to-kill victims between 1982 and 1986.
 Republican website listing the victims of "Shoot to Kill" allegations
 Bánú an Lae – Commemorative website for the Armagh killings

Extrajudicial killings
Law enforcement in Northern Ireland
 
Police misconduct in Northern Ireland
Royal Ulster Constabulary
Terrorist incidents in Northern Ireland
The Troubles (Northern Ireland)
Political scandals in the United Kingdom
Military scandals